Lafayette Avenue Presbyterian Church may refer to:
Lafayette Avenue Presbyterian Church (Buffalo, New York)
Lafayette Avenue Presbyterian Church, a church in Brooklyn noted for the abolitionist preaching of Theodore L. Cuyler